Sir William Pearce Howland,  (29 May 1811 – 1 January 1907) served as the second Lieutenant Governor of Ontario, from 1868 to 1873. He was one of the Fathers of Confederation.

Biography
Born in 1811 in Pawling, New York, William Howland was educated at Kinderhook Academy. In 1830 he settled in Cooksville, Upper Canada, and became a naturalised British subject in 1841. He operated Lambton Mills and later a grocery business in Toronto. In 1852 he acquired a grist mill, sawmill, and general store in Kleinburg, whose operations he left to his brother Henry Stark Howland. In 1857, Howland became a Member of the Legislative Assembly of the Province of Canada, and later served in the cabinet as Minister of Finance, Receiver General, and Postmaster General. He became a Member of Parliament in 1867 and was Minister of Inland Revenue from 1867 to 1868. He was created a CB in 1867. Howland was appointed Ontario's second Lieutenant Governor in 1868 and served until 1873. He was created a KCMG in 1879.

He was knighted in 1879 and died in Toronto in 1907. He is buried in Toronto's St. James Cemetery. Toronto in 1907. In 1906, at the request of Sir Wilfrid Laurier, Prime Minister of Canada, Howland prepared an autobiography that included extensive appendices about politics in the 1860s.

Personal life
On 12 July 1843, Sir William Pearce Howland, married Mary Ann (or Marianne) Blyth, the widow of David Webb, a ship's captain. Mary Anne and William had three children: William, Oliver and Florence. Their sons, William Holmes Howland and Oliver Aiken Howland, served as mayors of Toronto. Mary died in 1860.

William Pearce Howland, then a Minister of the Crown in Canada married Susannah Julia, daughter of Shrewsbury, Esquire, on 21 November 1865. She was born in London, England, 4, 1 May 1830, and educated there. She was a widow, who had accompanied her first husband (1850) Philip Hunt, of the Military Store Department, to the Mauritius, and thence to Canada.

Mrs. Howland was presented to Queen Victoria in 1866, on the occasion of the London Conference on Confederation. In 1875, she presented her step-daughter, Miss Howland (later Mrs. R. M. Merritt) to Her Majesty. On leaving Government House, Howland was presented with an address from citizens of Toronto, and Lady Howland was given a gold bracelet, with her initials set in diamonds, and containing a locket with miniature portraits of herself and husband. Lady Howland died in Toronto, 21 February 1886, and was buried in St. James's Cemetery.

In 1895, Sir William married Mary Elizabeth Rattaway, widow of James Bethune, QC By 1904, they had separated.

His sons, William Holmes Howland and Oliver Aiken Howland, served as mayors of Toronto.

References

External links
 
 

1811 births
1907 deaths
American emigrants to pre-Confederation Ontario
Canadian Knights Commander of the Order of St Michael and St George
Canadian Quakers
Companions of the Order of the Bath
Fathers of Confederation
Conservative Party of Canada (1867–1942) MPs
Lieutenant Governors of Ontario
Members of the House of Commons of Canada from Ontario
Members of the Legislative Assembly of the Province of Canada from Canada West
Members of the King's Privy Council for Canada
Persons of National Historic Significance (Canada)
People from Pawling, New York
People from York, Upper Canada
Immigrants to Upper Canada
Burials at St. James Cemetery, Toronto